Naval Air Station Whidbey Island (NASWI)  is a naval air station of the United States Navy located on two pieces of land near Oak Harbor, on Whidbey Island, in Island County, Washington.

The main portion of the base, Ault Field, is about three miles north of Oak Harbor. The other section, called the Seaplane Base for the PBY Catalina flying boats once based there, holds most of the island's Navy housing as well as the air station's main Navy Exchange and DeCA Commissary. Primarily used for Field Carrier Landing Practice (FCLP) by carrier-based jets, this field has no permanently assigned personnel.

NASWI supports the MH-60S Seahawk, EA-18G Growler, P-8 Poseidon, EP-3E ARIES, and C-40 Clipper aircraft.

History

1940s 
On 17 January 1941, almost 11 months before the United States entered World War II, the Office of the Chief of Naval Operations asked the Commandant of the 13th Naval District to find a location to re-arm and refuel U.S. Navy patrol planes defending Puget Sound. Lake Ozette, Indian Island, Keystone Harbor, Penn Cove and Oak Harbor were considered and rejected because of mountainous terrain, bluff shore front, inaccessibility, the absence of sufficient beaches, and lee shores. Within ten days, the commanding officer of Naval Air Station Seattle recommended the site of Saratoga Passage on the shores of Crescent Harbor and Forbes Point as a base suitable for seaplane takeoffs and landings under instrument conditions. A narrow strip of land tied Oak Harbor to what is now Maylor's Point Capehart Housing. Dredging, filling, and running water and power lines to the city were underway at the end of November when the word came to find a land plane site.

On December 8, three workers started a topographic survey of what would become Ault Field, about four miles to the north. Construction of Ault Field started on 1 March 1942. The first plane landed there on 5 August, when Lieutenant Newton Wakefield, a former civil engineer and airline pilot, who later became the air station's Operations Officer, brought his SNJ single-engine trainer in with little fanfare. Everyone was busy working on the still-incomplete runway.

On 21 September 1942, the air station's first commanding officer, Captain Cyril Thomas Simard, read the orders placing the field in use as a Navy facility. U.S. Naval Air Station Whidbey Island was duly commissioned. A year later, on 25 September 1943, the land plane field was named Ault Field, in memory of Commander William B. Ault, missing in action in the previous year's Battle of the Coral Sea. Following the recommendation of the Interdepartmental Air Traffic Control Board, an area 2½ miles southeast of Coupeville was approved as an auxiliary field to serve NAS Seattle. Survey work began in February 1943, and work started in March. Naval Outlying Landing Field (NOLF) Coupeville was in use by September.

At Ault Field, the earliest squadrons of aircraft were Grumman F4F Wildcats, which came aboard in 1942, followed by Grumman F6F Hellcats. Later that year, Lockheed PV-1 Venturas arrived for training. By the end of 1943, all Wildcats were gone, replaced by the Hellcat. In 1944, Douglas SBD Dauntless dive-bombers became the predominant aircraft at Ault Field, while at the Seaplane Base, several Consolidated PBY Catalina and Martin PBM Mariner seaplanes were aboard in the summer of 1944, augmented by a few land-based Martin B-26 Marauders that arrived earlier that year to be used for towing targets.

After World War II, operations slowed and the station was placed on reduced operating status. Many naval air stations across the United States were closing because they couldn't meet the requirements on post-war naval aviation; 6,000-foot runways were now the minimum standard and approach paths had to be suitable for radar-controlled approaches in any weather. Lockheed P2V Neptune patrol bombers, which arrived in the late 1940s, would eventually make up six patrol squadrons at NAS Whidbey.

1950s
The Korean War restored NAS Whidbey to life and expansion and construction accelerated. Throughout the early 1950s, Whidbey's primary land based patrol aircraft was the Lockheed P2 Neptune. During the Korean War and Cold War, six Neptunes were lost to attack by the Chinese, Soviets, or North Koreans. One of these six Neptunes was permanently stationed at NAS Whidbey and remains the only Neptune from Whidbey lost to attack.

While on a night Combat Reconnaissance mission of 4 Jan 1954, Patrol Squadron VP-2 on a six-month deployment from Whidbey to Iwakuni, Japan, suffered its only combat casualty with the loss of BuNo 127752, a P2V-5 Neptune, radio call sign 3 Cape Cod which was attacked over the Yellow Sea off the coast of China and North Korea. The Neptune reached the vicinity of Suwon Air Base, South Korea before crashing.

The crew of LT Jesse Beasley-PPC,  LT Fredric Traynor Prael-Co Pilot,  ENS Paul Dominick Morrelli,  ENS Stanley Burt Mulford,  ADC Robert George Archbold-Plane Captain,  AD2 James Frank Hand,  AT3 Bruce David Berger,  AO3 Gordon Spickelmier,  AL2 Rex Allen Claussen, and  AT2 LLoyd Bernard Rensink, all listed as FALLEN. In 2005 each crewmember was awarded the Navy Combat Action Ribbon, Purple Heart, Korean Service Medal and United Nations Service Medal. The South Korean Government bestowed its Korean Presidential Unit Citation and Korean War Service Medal on the men.

Patrol Squadron FIFTY (VP-50) moved from NAS Alameda, California, in June 1956, returning seaplanes to NAS Whidbey. Flying the Martin P5M-2 Marlin, patrol squadrons dominated the seaplane base until the late 1960s along with the seaplane tender, USS Salisbury Sound.

During the Korean War, patrol plane activity was stepped up again with several Naval Air Reserve units being called up and redesignated as active duty squadrons. By the end of the war, there were six VP (Patrol) squadrons and two Fleet Air Support squadrons based at Whidbey. In 1955, VP-29 returned from a deployment to the Pacific and was redesignated as Heavy Attack Squadron Two (VAH-2), the first heavy attack squadron on the West Coast, the "heavy" designation reflecting its concentration on nuclear weapons delivery. Later that year, it moved to NAS North Island in San Diego to switch to the Douglas A-3D Skywarrior.

In 1958, the Heavy Attack Squadron Six (VAH-6) ("Heavy-6") Fleurs, moved from NAS Moffett Field, California, where they had been the Navy's second nuclear attack squadron. As part of CVG-61/CVW-6, the squadron then made several WestPac deployments aboard the USS Ranger (CVA-61) prior to transferring to CVW-8 for operations in the Mediterranean aboard the USS Forrestal (CV-59). Transferred to Naval Air Station Sanford, Florida, VAH-6 was redesignated Heavy Reconnaissance Squadron Six (RVAH-6) in September 1965, beginning the squadron's transition to the A-5 Vigilante.

1960s
In the first quarter of 1960 a search and rescue (SAR) team was started at NAS Whidbey Island. Two Sikorsky HRS-2 helicopters, more commonly referred to as H-19 Chickasaws, were assigned to the SAR team soon to be replaced by two HRS-3's. The aircrewmen assigned to SAR were initially told this would be a two-year trial period during which time it would be decided if it would be permanent. If it didn't work it would be shut down. Today the NAS Whidbey SAR team is considered to be one of the elite rescue teams in the U.S. Navy.

In early 1965, patrol squadrons began to leave NAS Whidbey; VP-47 transferred to NAS Moffett Field and VP-17 to NAS Barbers Point, Hawaii. In July 1969, the patrol community appeared to be reviving with the delivery of the Lockheed P-3 Orion as a replacement for the venerable Lockheed P-2 Neptune, but in September 1969, VP-2 and VP-42 were deactivated.

1970s
On 1 March 1970, VP-1 transferred to NAS Barbers Point, ending seaplane patrol operations by active forces at NAS Whidbey Island. This also brought Fleet Air Wing Four to an end on 1 April 1970, leaving Patrol Squadron Sixty-nine (VP-69), a Naval Air Reserve squadron, as the sole remaining maritime patrol squadron at NAS Whidbey Island. Then in the 1970s and beyond, 16 Grumman A-6 Intruder squadrons were based at NAS Whidbey Island. Whidbey was now the West Coast training and operations center for these all-weather, medium attack bomber squadrons. In October 1970, Heavy Attack Squadron 10 (VAH-10) was redesignated Tactical Electronic Warfare Squadron 129 (VAQ-129), the Navy's first Northrop Grumman EA-6B Prowler squadron and the sole fleet replacement squadron for Navy and United States Marine Corps Prowler crews. With the exception of a forward deployed EA-6B squadron at NAF Atsugi, Japan and a sole Naval Air Reserve EA-6B squadron (VAQ-209) at Andrews AFB / NAF Washington, Maryland, NAS Whidbey Island supported all of the U.S. Navy's Prowler squadrons.

1990s
In late 1993, with the pending closures of NAS Moffett Field and NAS Barbers Point, additional P-3C Orion maritime patrol aircraft came aboard NAS Whidbey Island, along with the associated staffs of Commander, Patrol Wings, U.S. Pacific Fleet (COMPATWINGSPAC) and Commander, Patrol Wing TEN (COMPATWING 10). With the closure of Naval Air Station Agana, Guam, Fleet Air Reconnaissance Squadron ONE (VQ-1) also arrived at NAS Whidbey Island in 1994 with its Lockheed EP-3E Aries II aircraft. VQ-1 was placed under the clemency of COMPATWING 10 and the wing was redesignated Commander, Patrol and Reconnaissance Wing TEN (COMPATRECONWING 10). With the disestablishment of Reserve Patrol Wing, VP-69 was also placed under COMPATRECONWING 10.

In 1997, the last Pacific-based A-6E Intruder squadron, VA-196 "Milestones", was disestablished after a lengthy deployment for WESTPAC 1996. Command Master Chief Shawn Minerstone blew the final bosun's pipe and all plankowners from this squadron were reassigned to their new duty stations.

2000s
In January 2009, VAQ-129 accepted its first Boeing EA-18G Growler electronic warfare aircraft. Based on the F/A-18F Super Hornet fighter, the Growler has replaced the Navy's EA-6Bs.

2010s
Patrol Squadron 4 (VP-4) “Skinny Dragons” became the first squadron at NAS Whidbey Island to convert to the P-8 Poseidon maritime patrol aircraft in October 2016. On October 31, 2016 the new P-8A training center at NAS Whidbey Island opened.

Present day
In all, there are 20 active duty U.S. Navy squadrons and three U.S Navy Reserve squadrons based at NAS Whidbey Island. The air station also maintains a search and rescue unit that flies two Sikorsky MH-60S Nighthawk helicopters. With the addition of the MH-60S, Navy search and rescue provides 24-hour day and night maritime, inland and mountainous rescue support for Department of Defense personnel and the greater Pacific Northwest community. The SAR Unit provides 15-minute alert coverage Monday through Thursday from 0800–0200 or last plane on deck, Friday 0800-2200 or last plane on deck and 30-minute alert coverage at all other times of the year. Additionally, SAR has organic SAR Medical Technicians on all missions it performs. NASWI SAR primarily serves military aircrews, but missions to help civilians in distress are often approved and executed.

Over 50 tenant commands are at NAS Whidbey Island to provide training, medical and dental, and other support services, including a United States Air Force (USAF) squadron (390th ECS) which is an administrative unit supporting USAF officers assigned to some U.S. Navy EA-18G Growler squadrons. The base also continues its longstanding role as a center of activity for Naval Air Reserve operations and training in the region.

Tenant squadrons

See also 

 List of United States Navy airfields

References

External links

Whidbey Island, Naval Air Station
Whid
Buildings and structures in Island County, Washington
Airports in Washington (state)
Military Superfund sites
Superfund sites in Washington (state)
1942 establishments in Washington (state)
Military airbases established in 1942